The 1977–78 SK Rapid Wien season was the 80th season in club history.

Squad

Squad and statistics

Squad statistics

Fixtures and results

League

Cup

UEFA Cup

References

1977-78 Rapid Wien Season
Rapid